The British International College of Cairo (BICC) is a pre-school, primary school and secondary school based in 5th District in New Cairo, Egypt.

The BICC campus accommodates about 300 students from pre-K to year 12. Built on a 7,000 square metre site, the school has attractive modern facilities with 42 classrooms, 3 labs and 8 activity classes. The school has a student-to-teacher ratio of 11:1.

The British International College of Cairo, prepares students for LIFE.  BICC offers a British education.

Campuses

The BICC Campus includes sports fields built on a 4,000 square meter area. The college has a multi-purpose sports hall, gymnasium, fitness gym, volleyball and football facilities as well as a swimming pool.

Multi-purpose theatre

The BICC has a small theatre without a stage for dramatic performances and music festivals.

London Summer Camp
In its opening year, and again in 2019, BICC ran an English Summer Camp in the UK.

References

External links

 British International College of Cairo (BICC) 

Schools in New Cairo
International schools in Greater Cairo
Private schools in Egypt
International Baccalaureate schools in Egypt
British international schools in Egypt
Educational institutions established in 2015
2015 establishments in Egypt